Diogo dos Santos Lima (born December 27, 1985), known as Diogo Mucuri, is a Brazilian football player who plays for Cruzeiro Esporte Clube.

Early life
DDiogo Mucuri was born in Itabuna, Bahia, Brazil.

Career
He was brought up in the Cruzeiro EC youth teams. Diogo Mucuri has played for Cruzeiro in the Campeonato Brasileiro and Copa do Brasil.

Achievements
Campeonato Mineiro: 2006

References

1985 births
Living people
Brazilian footballers
Cruzeiro Esporte Clube players
Association football midfielders